Konrad Wert, known as Possessed by Paul James since 2005, is an American folk singer, songwriter and musician from Lee County, Florida.  His music is composed of string instruments including banjo, guitar and fiddle with roots within folk, blues and punk.  Raised within a small Mennonite Community among pacifists, service workers and transplants.  He is currently living in Texas with his wife and sons meeting the music demand by touring, sales on line etc.  He is also a special education teacher in Kerrville, Texas. Possessed by Paul James has starred in The Folk Singer, a film by Slowboat Films in 2008 while in circulation internationally.  In 2015 Wert along with Milk Products Media, embarked on a year documentary spreading the conversation and advocacy of Special Education awareness and the need for state/federal reform.  When It Breaks completed production in 2018 and is soon to release.

Breakout album 
At the end of 2013 'There Will Be Nights When I'm Lonely' was released with Hillgrass Bluebilly Records. The album initially charted at #12 on Billboard Magazine under the Country/Bluegrass genre. National Public Radio, CMT, MTV featured both articles and tracks from the release. The New York Times stated "PPJ a one man folk wonder"  as well as one of the top concerts at the 2014 Pickathon Music Festival of Oregon.

Current projects 
After 19 years of working in social services and education, Wert and family are presently embarking on varied projects while continually teaching.  "There must be a bond between the world of music performance and the world of social justice"; a strong theme in which the PPJ Family believes in and hopes to accomplish.

Discography

References

External links 
 www.ppjrecords.com

1976 births
Living people
Musicians from Texas
People from Collier County, Florida
American Mennonites
Mennonite musicians